Tekiau Aretaateta was a member of the Kiribati House of Assembly for the constituency of Tabuaeran.

References

Members of the House of Assembly (Kiribati)
Year of birth missing (living people)
Living people
Pillars of Truth politicians
People from Tabuaeran